is a public aquarium located in Edogawa Ward, Tokyo. It is located in Kasai Rinkai Park in Edogawa Ward, Tokyo, and Kasai Rinkai Bird Garden is also located in the park. It can be accessed from Kasai-Rinkai Park Station. The Predecessor is the Ueno Aquarium, which was set up in the Ueno Zoo. The building was designed by Yoshio Taniguchi.

History
Tokyo Sea Life Park has its origins in "Uonozoki", the first Public aquarium in Japan that was opened in 1882. It is a public aquarium that existed only during the exposition and was closed at the end of the exposition. After that, uonozoki was demolished, but in 1929, the Ueno Aquarium was opened in the same place at Ueno Zoo. In 1952, aquariums started breeding saltwater fish based on the experimental results of filtration equipment, etc., and opened the New Ueno Aquarium in 1964. New Ueno Aquarium is one of the aquariums that started to use acrylic glass for large tanks in earnest.

After that, in commemoration of the 100th anniversary of Ueno Zoo, formulated a plan to build the largest aquarium in Japan.  It officially opened in 1989 as Tokyo Sea Life Park.
All the creatures kept in the ueno aquarium were inherited by Tokyo Sea Life Park and the ueno aquarium was closed.

Overview

Approximately 650 species of organisms are bred in 47 tanks, including tuna that migrate around large donut-shaped tank.

At the beginning of the park, it was the largest and most popular Public aquarium in Japan, and the annual number of visitors in the first year of the park was 3.55 million, far exceeding the Japanese record at that time (2.4 million at Kobe City Suma Aqualife Park Kobe: 1987).  After that, the record was not broken until Osaka Aquarium was created.

The world's first successful exhibition of nurseryfish.  In addition, many of the exhibited creatures are directly collected locally by the Research Section of the Breeding and Exhibition Division, and rare creatures can be seen especially in polar aquariums.

It is open for free on May 4, May 5, October 1, and October 10.

Renewal

As the facility is aging 30 years after its opening, aquariums have begun to consider the construction of a new facility and the ideal aquarium.  aquariums soliciting opinions from the citizens of Tokyo at the end of 2018.  In January 2019, aquariums formulated the basic concept of building a new facility on the premises.  Then, in February 2020, a study group of experts approved the rebuilding plan report.  The scale is expected to have a total floor area of about 22,500 square meters and maintenance costs of 24 to 27 billion yen. A business plan will be formulated by the end of 2020, and it is expected to open in 2026.

Exhibited creatures

Many aquariums only show the names and figures of the fish, but there are also pictorial books and rooms with specialized staff for research. As a service improvement, a commentary using a digital photo frame panel was added next to the aquarium in May 2011.

Japan's first Pacific bluefin tuna, Scalloped hammerhead
Succeeded in long-term captivity and exhibition by preparing the collection, transportation and breeding environment.  Bluefin tuna with weak skin paid close attention to collection and transportation, and realized a group swimming exhibition.

aquariums have also established a method for growing large seaweeds that require good water quality, water flow, and sufficient light, such as Giant kelps, in a closed indoor tank. Seaweed captivity has a friendly tie-up with Monterey Bay Aquarium.

The two blue sharks started captivity in 1999 and inhabited for 210 and 246 days. This was the longest captivity record until it was overtaken by the Sendai Umino-Mori Aquarium. Also, in 2020, aquariums started captivity two blue sharks and inhabited them for five months.

 Aquarium
 Second floor
 A group of shark, ray, and sardine such as Scalloped hammerhead and blacktip reef shark are exhibited.  In the past, Pelagic thresher and Bonnethead were also exhibited.
 First floor
 "Voyagers of the sea" (Doughnut-shaped  tank. It was the largest indoor tank in Japan in 1989. It is a huge tank that connects to the second floor, but it is a different tank from the one where sharks are exhibited. Pacific bluefin tuna, Euthynnus affinis, Striped bonito, Houndfish, Rhina ancylostoma, Scalloped hammerhead are exhibited. Blue Shark, Ocean sunfish, Indo-Pacific sailfish, Longtail tuna, Tiger Shark, Shortfin mako shark, were also exhibited. Seats are installed in the space named Aqua Theater, so you can enjoy it calmly.)
 "Seas of the World" (The exhibits are divided into the Pacific Ocean, Indian Ocean, Atlantic Ocean, Caribbean, Deep sea, Arctic Ocean /Antarctic Ocean. In the past Goblin shark and Brama japonica have been exhibited in the deep sea tank.)
 "Nagisa species" (Mullet, red sea bream, common octopus, Amefurashi, etc. In the touching pool, Starfish, Sea urchin, etc.  In addition, if various conditions are met, you can also touch sharks such as Bullhead shark.)
 "Four species" of "Penguins Ecology" (Humboldt Penguins, King Penguins, Rockhopper Penguin, Fairy Penguins are bred outdoors. However, King Penguins and Rockhopper Penguins Since it is vulnerable to the heat of summer in Japan, it is bred indoors with a cooling facility in the summer and is not open to the public.)
 "Seaweed forest" (Exhibition centered on Giant kelp)
 "The Sea of Tokyo" (Ogasawara Islands, Seven Islands of Izu, Tokyo Bay are displayed separately. Pagrus major, Spiny red gurnard, etc.)
 "Ecology of sea birds" (murre, tufted puffin, etc.)
 Freshwater Aquarium
 Exhibiting creatures that inhabit Japanese freshwater such as Oikawa, Iwana, Yamame, and killifish.

Research and conservation 

At Tokyo Sea Life Park, aquariums working on the conservation and breeding of rare species both in Japan and overseas.

 Foreign species: Humboldt penguins, Fairy penguins etc. 
 Domestic species:Japanese fire belly newt, Shuttles hoppfish, Amphibians from Tokyo (Tokyo salamander, Japanese wrinkled frog, Japanese brown frog, etc.), Japanese Oryzias, Acheilognathus typus, Chaetodon daedalma etc.

In 2007, he also succeeded in Spawning of Leafy seadragon.
Humboldt penguins and Little penguins will work at JAZA member buildings. 
I am in charge of breeding adjustment, and I am making adjustments so that the pairing is genetically appropriate.  Japanese fire belly newt is also known as Ueno Zoo, Tama Zoological Park, and Inokashira Park Zoo. 
The habitat is conserved jointly by the four gardens. 
In addition, the results of research and research in a wide range of fields are utilized for exhibitions. 
aquarium conducting surveys and research on the breeding of aquatic organisms by accumulating his how and data through research and research on food, habitat, breeding environment etc, and inspection and dissection of dead individuals. Aquarium is focusing on the breed of bluefin tuna, and spawning was confirmed for the first time in the world in a closed tank on land.

aquariums working on continuous monitoring of the natural environment in Tokyo, jointly researching water quality maintenance technologies such as denitrification with companies, and improving breeding environment technologies.

Ocellated Ice Fish

On February 12, 2013, The Ocellated Ice Fish (Channichthyidae, Chionodraco rastrospinosus) spawned in captivity for the first time in the world. There were about 500 eggs with a diameter of about 4.5 mm.  The time when the eggs hatched is unknown, and the aquarium speculated that "if it is about the same as other Antarctic fish, it will be six months later." This is the world's first example of Breeding a Ocellated Ice Fish.

Escape of Penguin 337
The aquarium received global attention in 2012 when one of its 135 Humboldt penguins thrived in Tokyo Bay for 82 days after apparently scaling the 13 foot high wall and managing to get through a barbed-wire fence into the bay. The penguin, known only by its number (337), was recaptured by the keepers in late May 2012.

See also

 Ueno Zoo
 Aquamarine Fukushima
 Diamond and Flower Ferris Wheel
 National Museum of Nature and Science

References

External links
 Tokyo Sea Life Park Tokyo zoo net ［official］ English
 Tokyo Sea Life Park Tokyo zoo net officialSite Japanese
  Japanese
  Japanese

Aquaria in Japan
Edogawa, Tokyo
1989 establishments in Japan
Postmodern architecture in Japan